Carlos Perdomo is a Belizean politician. He is the former Minister of National Security in Belize. In that capacity he was the cabinet secretary and thus deputized for the Governor-General Sir Colville Young.

Perdomo was elected to the Belize House of Representatives for Caribbean Shores in 2008, defeating PUP incumbent Jose Coye. He was not a candidate for re-election in 2012.

References

Year of birth missing (living people)
Living people
United Democratic Party (Belize) politicians
Government ministers of Belize
Members of the Belize House of Representatives for Caribbean Shores